Department of Supply and Development may refer to:

 Department of Supply and Development (1939–42), an Australian government department
 Department of Supply and Development (1948–50), an Australian government department